WDBK (91.5 FM) is a college radio station. "The Community Alternative", WDBK broadcasts in the South Jersey/Philadelphia market that covers most of Camden County and parts of Gloucester and Burlington counties in New Jersey. WDBK's weekday programming consists of 1-hour live radio shows during the fall and spring semesters from 10 am to 3 pm. During the evenings and weekends, there are some specialty shows (not live) that will air.

In August 2014, Camden County College explored a sale of the WDBK license by listing it on a government liquidation website. The move came after it announced plans for the station to stream its programming on the Internet; in addition, much of WDBK's equipment is in need of replacement.

References

External links
WDBK website
WDBK On Facebook

DBK
Gloucester Township, New Jersey
Radio stations established in 1977